Mina San Vicente is a Peruvian football club, playing in the city of Junín, Peru.

The club were founded 1970 and play in the Copa Perú which is the third division of the Peruvian league.

History
The club was founded June 1, 1970 including the support of the mining business "San Vicente" that operates in the province of Chanchamayo.

The club have played at the highest level of Peruvian football on five occasions, from 1987 Torneo Descentralizado until 1991 Torneo Descentralizado, when was relegated to the Copa Perú.

See also
List of football clubs in Peru
Peruvian football league system

References

External links
Perú 1989

Football clubs in Peru